Illinois Route 91 (IL 91) is a rural state route in central Illinois. It runs from the northwest edge of Peoria at U.S. Highway 150 (US 150 to U.S. Highway 34 and Illinois Route 78 south of Kewanee.

Route description 
IL 91 serves the cities of Toulon, Wyoming, Princeville, and Dunlap. It travels concurrently with IL 90 around Princeville.

IL 91 does not travel in a straight line between any two major towns. IL 91's endpoints are generally northwest-to-southeast, but the route consists entirely of north–south and east–west stretches.

The Rock Island Trail State Park follows IL 91 for much of its length. This State Park trail is the former right-of-way of a Peoria branch line of the Chicago, Rock Island and Pacific Railroad.

History 

SBI Route 91 was the current U.S. Route 150 from Knoxville to Peoria. Prior to 1936, Illinois Route 30 mostly followed present-day IL 91 and a part of IL 17 east of Galva. Later, IL 30 was rerouted north of Toulon which entirely followed current IL 91. In March 1941, the state announced that IL 91 was replacing the designation of IL 30 from Kewanee to US 150, and has remained so to this day.

Major intersections

References

External links

091
Transportation in Henry County, Illinois
Transportation in Stark County, Illinois
Transportation in Peoria County, Illinois
Year of establishment missing
U.S. Route 150